The Districts of Pakistan; are the third-order administrative divisions of Pakistan, below provinces and divisions, but forming the first-tier of local government. In total, there are 170 districts in Pakistan including the Capital Territory and the districts of Azad Kashmir and Gilgit Baltistan. These districts are further divided into Tehsils, Union Councils.

History
In 1947, when Pakistan gained independence there were 124 districts. In 1969, 2 new districts (Tangail and Patuakhali) in East Pakistan were formed totalling to 126. After the Independence of Bangladesh, Pakistan lost 20 of its districts and so there were 106 districts. In 2001, the number was reduced to 102 by the merger of the 5 districts of Karachi Central, Karachi East, Karachi South, Karachi West and Malir to form Karachi District. The number of districts rose to 106 again in December 2004, when four new districts were created in the province of Sindh of which one (Umerkot) had existed until 2000 and three districts (Kashmore, Qambar and Jamshoro) were newly created. The new districts were carved out of Mirpur Khas, Jacobabad, Larkana and Dadu Districts respectively. In May 2005, the Punjab provincial government created a new district by raising the status of Nankana Sahib from a tehsil of Sheikhupura District to a district in its own right. On 11 July 2011, the Sindh Government restored again the districts of Karachi South, Karachi East, Malir, Karachi West and Karachi Central, then later in 2013, the district of Korangi was carved out of Karachi East District. In Azad Jammu and Kashmir, a second-tier of government was formed from three administrative divisions into ten districts. In Gilgit–Baltistan, there are ten districts divided between the two regions of Gilgit and Baltistan. In 2018, Federally Administered Tribal Areas (FATA) was merged with Khyber Pakhtunkhwa province and FATA agencies were converted into districts.

Chagai is the largest district of Pakistan by area while Lahore District is the largest by population with a total population of 11,126,285 at the 2017 census. Quetta is the largest district of Balochistan by population with a total population of 2,275,699 at the 2017 census. Bahawalpur is the largest district of Punjab by area. Chitral is the largest by area and Peshawar is the largest by population from Khyber Pakhtunkhwa with the population of 4,269,079 at the Census 2017. Sindh's largest district by area is Tharparkar and by population its Karachi West with a population of 3,914,757 at the 2017 Census. The combined population of the six districts of Karachi division is over 16 million at the 2017 census, giving an average population for these six districts of Karachi division of over 2.675 million each. Neelum and Kotli are the largest districts of Azad Kashmir by area and population respectively. Gilgit is the largest by area and population both for Gilgit-Baltistan.

Administration

Deputy commissioner

A deputy commissioner (popularly abbreviated to "DC") is the executive head of the district. Deputy commissioners are appointed by the government from the Pakistan Administrative Service.

District council

A district council (or zila council) is a local government body at the district level.

The functions of a district council include construction and maintenance of roads, and bridges, building hospitals and dispensaries, schools and educational institutions, health facilities and sanitation, tube wells for drinking water, rest houses, and coordination of activities of the Union councils within the district.

Provinces and Territories

Azad Jammu and Kashmir

Balochistan

Gilgit Baltistan

Khyber Pakhtunkhwa

Note: Recently merged 7 agencies and Frontier Regions of FATA in Khyber Pakhtunkhwa included in the list. Population and area of Frontier Regions is merged in respective districts.

Punjab

Sindh

See also
Administrative units of Pakistan
City Districts of Pakistan
List of Pakistani Districts by Human Development Index

Notes

All the figures require being re-checked. Data entry error has occurred in Sindh Province.

References

Further reading

External links
 from the Population Census Organization (Government of Pakistan)

 
Districts
Districts, Pakistan